Vladimír Koník (born 3 April 1968) is a former football player from Slovakia and recently manager of FC Petržalka. His former club was FK Senica.

External links
 Futbalnet profile
 AS Trenčín profile

References

1968 births
Living people
Slovak footballers
Slovak football managers
Slovak expatriate footballers
FK Inter Bratislava managers
AS Trenčín managers
FK Senica managers
FC Nitra managers
Association footballers not categorized by position